Österreichische Post is the company responsible for postal service in Austria. This company was established in 1999 after its split-off from the mail corporate division of the former state-owned PTT agency Post- und Telegraphenverwaltung (de; PTV). It is listed on the Vienna Stock Exchange.

History
The first standardised postal service was set up between Innsbruck and Mechelen, Belgium in 1490. By 1563 an extensive system of mail routes existed connecting Vienna with cities in Belgium, France, Italy, Spain and Portugal. In 1722 In Emperor Charles VI made the postal service a government monopoly and by the mid-18th century passenger carrying mail coach service began.

During the 1800s letter boxes, money orders, cash-on-delivery services were introduced and a pneumatic mail system was set up in Vienna in 1875.

The first regular international airmail route between Vienna, Kraków and Lviv was established on March 31, 1918, and terminated on October 15. Three definitive stamps were overprinted "FLUGPOST" for this flight and showed that a regular airmail delivery was feasible even during wartime. Many philatelists consider this regular post delivery with aeroplanes to be the actual start of airmail history.

Postal codes were introduced nationwide in 1966.

Philately
Though not in general use until 80 years later, the first postmarks were introduced in 1787 by Georg Khumer, a postmaster in Friesach identifying time and place of use, and Austria's first postage stamps were issued in 1850.

Services

Since 1986 Österreichische Post started Express mail services and is an EMS Cooperative contracted delivery agent within the UPU.

In April 2020, Österreichische Post launched bank99, a credit institution that offers online services as well as personal customer support at around 1,800 service points throughout Austria. Österreichische Post owns 80% of the bank's shares, while a 20% stake is held by CAPITAL BANK – GRAWE GRUPPE AG. Post offices and postal service partners serve as distribution channels, which allows bank99 to potentially provide financial services for 99% percent of the Austrian population, closing supply gaps in rural areas.

Bank99 offers checking accounts for private customers, services for national and international financial transactions, and credit cards. Secure international money transfers are carried out in partnership with Ria Money transfer. The company has positioned itself in opposition to direct banks, offering personal services through a network of physical locations.

Controversy
In 2019, Austria's data protection authority imposed a fine of 18 million euros ($20 million) on Österreichische Post for illegally using customers’ data, such as ages and addresses, to calculate a probability of which political party they might support and sell its findings.

See also
 Austrian post offices in Crete
 Austrian post offices in Liechtenstein
 Austrian post offices in the Ottoman Empire
 Postage stamps and postal history of Austria
 Postal codes in Austria

References

External links
 
Vienna Stock Exchange: Market Data Österreichische Post AG
 History of Post, Telegraphs and Telephone in Vienna - 1905 (In German)

Service companies of Austria
Austria
Postal system of Austria
Organizations established in 1999
1999 establishments in Austria